Daşlı Çalğan (also, Daşlı Calğan and Dashly Dzhalgan) is a village in the Siazan Rayon of Azerbaijan.  The village forms part of the municipality of Məşrif.

References 

Populated places in Siyazan District